Castello marchesale (Italian for Marquis Castle)  is a  Renaissance castle in Palmoli, Province of Chieti (Abruzzo).

History

Architecture

References

External links

Marchesale (Palmoli)
Palmoli